Richmond Public Library is a public library in Richmond, Virginia. While many other libraries in the United States were provided initial funding by Andrew Carnegie, the City of Richmond famously rejected Carnegie funding twice.

History
After the City of Richmond's finance committee rejected the first Carnegie offer in 1901, Carnegie offered to donate $100,000 to the city of Richmond, Virginia, for a public library. The city council had to furnish a site for the building and guarantee that $10,000 in municipal funds would be budgeted for the library each year. Despite the support from the majority of Richmond's civic leaders, the city council rejected Carnegie's offer. A combination of aversion to new taxes, fear of modernization, and fear that Carnegie might require the city to admit black patrons to his library account for the local government's refusal.[33] (fear that Carnegie might require the city to admit black patrons to his library account for the local government's refusal.[35] A Richmond Public Library did open in 1924 with alternative sources of funding.) Richmond formed a Richmond Public Library Association in 1905. The Association did not gather sufficient funds to open a library until 1922, when John Stewart Bryan became president of the Association. The next year, in 1923, Bryan became chairman of the Richmond Public Library Board, and in 1924, the Board chose the former home of Lewis Ginter as the site of the first Library.  The first branch opened in 1925 as the Phyllis Wheatley Branch of the YWCA to serve African-Americans. In 1925, Sallie May Dooley died and left $500,000 to the City to construct a public library in memory of her husband, Major James H. Dooley. The Dooley Library (at the same location as the current Main library) opened in 1930 and the contents of the original library were moved in.

In 1947, RPL Board opened all branches of the library system to blacks.

Locations
In addition to its Main branch in Downtown Richmond, RPL currently operates eight other branches to serve the Richmond City population. 
 Belmont
 Broad Rock
 East End
 Ginter Park
 Hull Street
 North Avenue
 West End
 Westover Hills

References

1924 establishments in Virginia
Library buildings completed in 1924
Government of Richmond, Virginia
Public libraries in Virginia